Grover Covington (born March 25, 1956) is a former Canadian Football League defensive end for the Hamilton Tiger-Cats and member of the Canadian Football Hall of Fame.

Professional career
Covington's career began in 1981 as a free agent signing by the Montreal Alouettes. However a pre-season trade that year sent him to the Hamilton Tiger-Cats, where he played his entire career. Covington was a seven-time CFL All-Star and often led the league in quarterback sacks. He won the Schenley Award for Most Outstanding Defensive Player once and also led the Tiger-Cats to a Grey Cup victory in 1986.  He finished his career with 157 sacks, a CFL record. In 1995 Covington was inducted along with former teammate Chet Grimsley into the Johnson C. Smith University Sports Hall of Fame. (Grimsley's 2011 book The White Golden Bull: How Faith in God Transcended Racial Barriers includes a chapter on the relationship between the author, a white student at the historically black university, and Covington.) Covington was inducted into the Canadian Football Hall of Fame in 2000 and, in November 2006, was voted one of the CFL's Top 50 players (#28) of the league's modern era by Canadian sports network TSN.

Personal life
His son, Christian Covington, plays as a nose tackle for the Los Angeles Chargers of the National Football League-

References

External links
Just Sports Stats

1956 births
Living people
American players of Canadian football
Canadian football defensive linemen
Canadian Football Hall of Fame inductees
Canadian Football League Most Outstanding Defensive Player Award winners
Hamilton Tiger-Cats players
Johnson C. Smith University alumni
Johnson C. Smith Golden Bulls football players
People from Monroe, North Carolina
Players of American football from North Carolina